Statistics of Austrian Football Bundesliga in the 1977–78 season.

Overview
It was contested by 10 teams, and FK Austria Wien won the championship.

Teams and locations

Teams of 1977–78 Austrian Football Bundesliga
FC Admira/Wacker
Austria Wien
First Vienna
Grazer AK
LASK
Rapid Wien
Sturm Graz
VÖEST Linz
Wacker Innsbruck
Wiener Sport-Club

League standings

Results
Teams played each other four times in the league. In the first half of the season each team played every other team twice (home and away), and then did the same in the second half of the season.

First half of season

Second half of season

References
Austria - List of final tables (RSSSF)

Austrian Football Bundesliga seasons
Aust
1977–78 in Austrian football